Robert Lembke (Robert Emil Weichselbaum) (born 17 September 1913 in Munich; died 14 January 1989)  was a German television presenter and game show host.

Life 
Lembke started to study law at the age of 18, but dropped out of college. He then worked as a newspaper journalist (Berliner Tageblatt and Simplicissimus). He refused to sign a loyalty oath to Adolf Hitler and was subsequently barred from working as a journalist in Nazi Germany. He then took a job at IG Farben. His Jewish father had fled to England in 1936. In 1935, Lembke married Mathilde Bertholt and three years later they had a daughter.

After World War II Lembke worked as a journalist. Together with Hans Habe, Erich Kästner and Stefan Heym Lembke started German newspaper Die Neue Zeitung in Munich.Since 1949 Lembke worked for German broadcaster Bayerischer Rundfunk. Lembke was, from 1961 to his death in 1989, game show host of What's My Line? on ARD television.

Awards 

 1968: Goldene Kamera in Category Best Moderation for Was bin ich?
 1970: Bavarian Order of Merit
 1983: Goldene Kamera in Category Camera 30 Jahre Fernsehen
 1985: Bambi Award

External links 

 
 
 WDR-Reportage over Robert Lembkes (german)
 Der Schweinepriester - einestages - 20. Todestag Robert Lembke (german)

References 

German game show hosts
German people of Jewish descent
Officers Crosses of the Order of Merit of the Federal Republic of Germany
1913 births
1989 deaths
Burials at the Westfriedhof (Munich)
ARD (broadcaster) people
Bayerischer Rundfunk people
Card game book writers